Azerbaijani dialects reflect relatively minor language differences and are mutually intelligible. The Azerbaijani language has two distinct sublanguages: Northern and Southern. Dialects include Qashqai.

Southern Azerbaijani contains many Arabic and Persian words that are not familiar to northern speakers. This began to increase in 1828.

Dialect groups 
The main dialect groups are Eastern (Derbent, Baku, Shamakhi, Mugan and Lankaran dialects), Western (Qazakh, Karabakh, Ganja and Ayrum dialects), Northern (Nukha, Zaqatala - Qakh dialects) and Southern (Yerevan, Nakhchivan, Ordubad and Tabriz dialects). The dialects are mutually intelligible but differ with regard to accent, syntax, and vocabulary. Eastern and northern groups of dialects were influenced by the Kypchak language.

The dialects can be distinguished by geographical location such as Iran, Turkey, Iraq, Dagestan and Georgia. Afshar, Qashqai, Aynallu, Bayat, Shahsven, Qajar and Turkman dialects stem from these areas. Others are Tabriz, Urmia, Khoy, Kushchinskiy (central Ostan), Maraga, Merende, Uryantepin, Turkmenchay, Ardabil, Sarabian, Mian, Galugiha (Mazandaran), Lotfabad and Dergez (Khorasan- Rizaui) dialects.

According to Encyclopedia Iranica:

According to Ethnologue, North Azerbaijani has the following regional dialects, each of which is slightly different from the other: "Quba, Derbend, Baku, Shamakhi, Salyan, Lenkaran, Qazakh, Airym, Borcala, Terekeme, Qyzylbash, Nukha, Zaqatala (Mugaly), Qabala, Nakhchivan, Ordubad, Ganja, Shusha (Karabakh), Karapapak, Kutkashen, Kuba". While South Azerbaijani has the following dialects: "Aynallu (Inallu, Inanlu), Karapapakh, Tabriz, Afshari (Afsar, Afshar), Shahsavani (Shahseven), Moqaddam, Baharlu (Kamesh), Nafar, Qaragozlu, Pishagchi, Bayat, Qajar".

Publications 
The first comparative analysis of the Turkic (Azerbaijani) dialects was carried out by Mirza Kazimbey in his 1839 book The General Grammar of the Turkish – Tatar Language.

During 1924 - 1930, Soviet researchers collected some 60 thousand dialect words. The program was prepared to compile a comprehensive dictionary. N.I. Ashari led this program. The Academy of Sciences of the Azerbaijan SSR published a one-volume dictionary named Dialectological Dictionary of the Azerbaijani Language in 1964, which covered more than six thousand words.

At the end of the 20th century and the beginning of the 21st century, the Dictionary of the Dialects of the Azerbaijani language was published. The dictionary contained samples from Zangibasar, Sharur, Yardimli, Tebriz, Gubadli, Lachin, Kalbacar, Balakan, Qakh and Zagatala.

References 

Azerbaijani language dialects
Azerbaijani